This is a list of songs written and produced by R. Kelly.

Songs

References

 
Kelly, R.